Southend is a community in north-eastern Saskatchewan, Canada located at the southern end of Reindeer Lake, the ninth largest lake in Canada. The community is the terminus of Highway 102 and is 221 km (137 miles) north-east of La Ronge.

The community consists of the northern settlement of Southend with a population of 35 and Southend 200, a reserve of the Peter Ballantyne Cree Nation, with a population of 904.

History
Fur trade posts were established at or near the community as early as 1792. Reindeer River Post (1792, 1795) at Southend was a North West Company Post. Reindeer Lake Post (or Clapham House) (1798–1892) at Southend was a Hudson's Bay Company post. South Reindeer Lake Post (1936–1941) was a Hudson's Bay Company post located south of  Southend on the Reindeer River.

In February 1980, two sounding Black Brant 5B rockets were launched from Southend. They reached an altitude of about 156 kilometres.

Demographics 
The population of Southend 200, IR Saskatchewan was 904 in 2011. Cree was the mother tongue chosen by 465 residents followed by English with 425 and Dene with 5. Almost all residents also spoke English.

See also 
List of communities in Saskatchewan
Southend/Hans Ulricksen Field Aerodrome
Southend Water Aerodrome
CBKA-FM

References 

Division No. 18, Unorganized, Saskatchewan
Northern settlements in Saskatchewan
Former northern hamlets in Saskatchewan
Peter Ballantyne Cree Nation